Dimah Mil or Dimeh Mil may refer to:
 Dimah Mil Olya
 Dimah Mil Sofla